Elizabeth Frankenstein ( Lavenza) is a fictional character first introduced in Mary Shelley's 1818 novel Frankenstein; or, The Modern Prometheus. In both the novel and its various film adaptations, she is the fiancée of Victor Frankenstein.

Role in the novel
Born in Italy, Elizabeth Lavenza was adopted by Victor's family. In the first edition (1818), she is the daughter of Victor's aunt and her Italian husband. After her mother's death, Elizabeth's father—intending to remarry—writes to Victor's father and asks if he and his wife would like to adopt the child and spare her being raised by a stepmother (as Mary Shelley had unhappily been). In the original novel, then, Victor and Elizabeth are cousins. In the revised third edition (1831), Victor's parents, during a stay on Lake Como, find Elizabeth being raised by a foster family after her German mother's death and the disappearance of her Italian father. Thus, in the revised edition she is unrelated to Victor, who still describes her as "my more than sister." Victor describes her as his perfect woman: young, beautiful, and completely devoted to him. Elizabeth continually writes letters to Victor, encouraging him and acting as a positive force against his guilt at creating the monster.

After the monster begs Victor to create a mate for him and he agrees, he is furious when Victor destroys it before completion and vows, "I will be with you on your wedding-night." This grim foreboding turns out to be true; on the day of Elizabeth's marriage to Victor, the monster breaks into the bridal suite and strangles her. Her death is significant because it gives Victor a unique understanding of his creation; he now knows what it feels like to be completely alone in the world, with nothing to live for but revenge.

Role in the Universal films
In James Whale's 1931 film adaptation of the novel, Elizabeth is Henry Frankenstein's fiancée, and has no familial relation to him.

She worries when Henry secludes himself in his laboratory and refuses to see anyone, and begs his mentor, Professor Waldman, to talk some sense into him. After his experiments get out of control, Henry departs the laboratory and returns home to his ancestral village. The monster runs loose on the day of the wedding, and Henry tells Elizabeth to stay in one of the rooms. The monster climbs through the window and frightens her so badly that she faints. She is last seen by Henry's bedside as he recovers from his climactic battle with the monster.

In Bride of Frankenstein, Elizabeth and Henry are married. She is kidnapped by the monster as a means of making Henry agree to create the Monster a mate. When the monster decides to destroy Frankenstein Castle with himself, his bride and the evil Septimus Pretorious inside, he allows Henry and Elizabeth to leave. The couple are last seen holding each other as the castle burns down.

Role in Mary Shelley's Frankenstein
Elizabeth (Helena Bonham-Carter) plays the same role in the 1994 film Mary Shelley's Frankenstein as she does in the novel, save one significant alteration. After Elizabeth is murdered by the monster (Robert De Niro), a distraught Victor (Kenneth Branagh) reanimates her as an undead being. Soon after Elizabeth resurrects, the monster arrives and tries to woo her for himself. As Victor and his creation begin to fight over her, Elizabeth realizes what she has become and screams in agony. Spurning both suitors, she commits suicide by setting herself on fire with a Kerosene lamp.

Role in Young Frankenstein
In Mel Brooks' 1974 film Young Frankenstein, Elizabeth (Madeline Kahn) is a tightly wound socialite who is engaged to Dr. Frederick Frankenstein (Gene Wilder). When Frederick inherits his great-grandfather's estate in Transylvania, Elizabeth sees him off at the train station. Although Frederick tries to be affectionate, Elizabeth recoils from physical touching out of fear that it might smear lipstick, wrinkle her dress, or mess up her hair.

She arrives in Transylvania for a visit shortly after Frederick's monster (Peter Boyle) escapes from prison.

After Elizabeth is shown to her room, Frederick tries to convince her to sleep with him. Elizabeth teasingly pretends to agree before insisting on waiting until their wedding night. Extremely frustrated, Frederick leaves the room followed by a string of condescending endearments from Elizabeth.

As Elizabeth prepares for bed, the monster enters her bedroom window and kidnaps her. When they are alone in the forest, Elizabeth is horrified to learn that the monster wants sex. Elizabeth first offers some typical dating excuses, but then she sees the monster's enormous "Schwanstücker". Elizabeth gasps, "Oh, my God! WOOF!" She gleefully has consensual sex with the monster - over and over again.

When Frederick plays the violin to summon his creation back to the castle, Elizabeth is devastated when the monster leaves her side.

She screams, "Where are you going? Oh, you men are all alike. Seven or eight quick ones and you're off with the boys to boast and brag. You'd better keep your mouth shut! Oh, I think I love him."

After an operation to stabilize the monster's brain, Elizabeth marries Frederick's now erudite and sophisticated creation. She is last seen with her hair styled just like the female monster from The Bride of Frankenstein.

Role in Frankenstein (2015)
In the 2015 adaptation, Elizabeth is played by Carrie-Anne Moss and has a rather different role. She is played as Victor's wife and helps him to create the monster (here named Adam), serving as a mother figure for him. When Adam is caught and taken to a police delegacy, he gives the police officers Elizabeth's ID badge and calls her "mother", so they call her, but she says she doesn't know Adam, abandoning him.

At the ending, Adam finds his creators house, where he attacks Victor, but Elizabeth calms him down and tells him the truth about his origins. Victor makes his creation sleep and tries to kill him, so she tries to save him, but he accidentally kills his wife and runs away. When Adam is awake, he puts his mother's dead body and himself on fire as he cries "I am Adam!".

Portrayals
Elizabeth Lavenza was portrayed by Mae Clarke in Frankenstein, by Valerie Hobson in The Bride of Frankenstein, by Hazel Court in The Curse of Frankenstein, by Helena Bonham Carter in Mary Shelley's Frankenstein, by Nicole Lewis in the Hallmark miniseries based on Shelley's novel, and by Lacey Turner in Frankenstein's Wedding. Elizabeth is recreated as Eli in the Pemberley Digital web series Frankenstein, M.D.. Elizabeth is portrayed by Katie Weston in Frankenstein: The Musical. Elizabeth was portrayed on stage by Naomie Harris in Danny Boyle's 2011 production of Nick Dear's stage play adaptation of Shelley's novel.

See also
 Universal Monsters
 Mae Clarke
 Colin Clive
 Boris Karloff
 Brona Croft

References

External links
 
 

Frankenstein characters
Literary characters introduced in 1818
Female horror film characters
Fictional German people
Fictional Italian people
Fictional Swiss people
Female characters in literature
Fictional murdered people